Sa-kwa is the debut film of South Korean director Kang Yi-kwan. Premiered at the 2005 Toronto International Film Festival, although not released in South Korea until late 2008. This subtle, introspective drama of shifting moods—with acute observation of the dynamics of relationships.

Plot
Hyun-jung (Moon So-ri), dumped by her boyfriend of seven years, Min-seok (Lee Sun-kyun), is broken and teetering on the brink of emotional collapse as she seeks a new suitor and get married as soon as possible since her biological clock keeps ticking away. Sang-hoon (Kim Tae-woo) enters her life; Hyun-jung is attracted to his shy demeanor and marries him. But then Min-seok reconsiders and wants to return to her.

Cast
Moon So-ri as Hyun-jung
Kim Tae-woo as Sang-hoon
Lee Sun-kyun as Min-seok
Kang Rae-yeon as Hye-jeong

References

External links 
  
 
 
 

2005 films
2005 romantic drama films
South Korean independent films
South Korean romantic drama films
Chungeorahm Films films
2000s Korean-language films
2005 directorial debut films
2000s South Korean films